The University of Massachusetts Amherst (UMass Amherst, UMass) is a public research university in Amherst, Massachusetts and the sole public land-grant university in Commonwealth of Massachusetts. Founded in 1863 as an agricultural college, it is the flagship and the largest campus in the University of Massachusetts system, as well as the first established. It is also a member of the Five College Consortium, along with four other colleges in the Pioneer Valley: Amherst College, Smith College, Mount Holyoke College, and Hampshire College.

It is the largest university in Massachusetts by campus size and largest university by undergraduate enrollment in Massachusetts, second to Boston University in total enrollment due to Boston University's large postgraduate enrollment. The university offers academic degrees in 109 undergraduate, 77 master's and 48 doctoral programs. Programs are coordinated in nine schools and colleges. As of Fall 2022, UMass Amherst has an annual enrollment of more than 32,000 students, along with approximately 1,900 faculty members. The University of Massachusetts Amherst is classified among "R1: Doctoral Universities – Very high research activity". According to the National Science Foundation, the university spent $211 million on research and development in 2018.

The university's 21 varsity athletic teams compete in NCAA Division I and are collectively known as the Minutemen and Minutewomen. The university is a member of the Atlantic 10 Conference, while playing ice hockey in Hockey East and football as an FBS Independent.

The university's past and present students and faculty include four Nobel Prize laureates, a National Humanities Medal winner, numerous Fulbright, Goldwater, Churchill, Truman, and Gates Scholars, Olympic Gold Medalists, a United States Poet Laureate, as well as several Pulitzer Prize recipients and Grammy, Emmy, and Academy Award winners.

History

Foundation and early years

The university was founded in 1863 under the provisions of the Federal Morrill Land-Grant Colleges Act to provide instruction to Massachusetts citizens in "agricultural, mechanical, and military arts." Accordingly, the university was initially named the Massachusetts Agricultural College, popularly referred to as "Mass Aggie" or "M.A.C." In 1867, the college had yet to admit any students, been through two Presidents, and had still not completed any college buildings. That same year, William S. Clark was appointed President of the college and Professor of Botany. He quickly appointed a faculty, completed the construction plan, and, in the fall of 1867, admitted the first class of approximately 50 students. Clark became the first president to serve longterm after the schools opening and is often regarded the primary founding father of the college. Of the school's founding figures, there are a traditional "founding four" -- Clark, Levi Stockbridge, Charles Goessmann, and Henry Hill Goodell, described, respectively, as "the botanist, the
farmer, the chemist, [and] the man of letters."

The original buildings consisted of Old South College (a dormitory located on the site of the present South College), North College (a second dormitory once located just south of today's Machmer Hall), the Chemistry Laboratory, also known as College Hall (once located on the present site of Machmer Hall), the Boarding House (a small dining hall located just north of the present Campus Parking Garage), the Botanic Museum (located on the north side of the intersection of Stockbridge Road and Chancellor's Hill Drive) and the Durfee Plant House (located on the site of the new Durfee Conservatory).

Although enrollment was slow during the 1870s, the fledgling college built momentum under the leadership of President Henry Hill Goodell. In the 1880s, Goodell implemented an expansion plan, adding the College Drill Hall in 1883 (the first gymnasium), the Old Chapel Library in 1885 (one of the oldest extant buildings on campus and an important symbol of the University), and the East and West Experiment Stations in 1886 and 1890. The Campus Pond, now the central focus of the University Campus, was created in 1893 by damming a small brook. 

The early 20th century saw great expansion in terms of enrollment and the scope of the curriculum. The first female student was admitted in 1875 on a part-time basis and the first full-time female student was admitted in 1892. In 1903, Draper Hall was constructed for the dual purpose of a dining hall and female housing. The first female students graduated with the class of 1905. The first dedicated female dormitory, the Abigail Adams House (on the site of today's Lederle Tower) was built in 1920.

By the start of the 20th century, the college was thriving and quickly expanded its curriculum to include the liberal arts. The Education curriculum was established in 1907. In recognition of the higher enrollment and broader curriculum, the college was renamed Massachusetts State College in 1931.

Following World War II, the G.I. Bill, facilitating financial aid for veterans, led to an explosion of applicants. The college population soared and presidents Hugh Potter Baker and Ralph Albert Van Meter labored to push through major construction projects in the 1940s and 1950s, particularly with regard to dormitories (now Northeast and Central Residential Areas). Accordingly, the name of the college was changed in 1947 to the University of Massachusetts.

Modern era

By the 1970s, the University continued to grow and gave rise to a shuttle bus service on campus as well as many other architectural additions; this included the Murray D. Lincoln Campus Center complete with a hotel, office space, fine dining restaurant, campus store, and passageway to the parking garage, the W. E. B. Du Bois Library, and the Fine Arts Center.

Over the course of the next two decades, the John W. Lederle Graduate Research Center and the Conte National Polymer Research Center were built and UMass Amherst emerged as a major research facility. The Robsham Memorial Center for Visitors welcomed thousands of guests to campus after its dedication in 1989. For athletic and other large events, the Mullins Center was opened in 1993, hosting capacity crowds as the Minutemen basketball team ranked at number one for many weeks in the mid-1990s, and reached the Final Four in 1996.

21st century
In 2003, Massachusetts State Legislature legally designated University of Massachusetts Amherst as a research University and the "flagship campus of the University of Massachusetts system". That same year, the Massachusetts State Legislature legally designated UMass Amherst as a Research University and the "flagship campus of the UMass system." The university was named a top producer of Fulbright Award winners in the 2008–2009 academic year. Additionally, in 2010, it was named one of the "Top Colleges and Universities Contributing to Teach For America's 2010 Teaching Corps."

Since World War II, the imagery on the official seal of the university has been nearly identical to the state flag of the Commonwealth of Massachusetts. In 2022, the university decided to replace it and is currently in the process to change both its official seal and motto.

Organization and administration

Colleges and schools

Since the University of Massachusetts Amherst was founded as the Massachusetts Agricultural College in 1863, 25 individuals have been at the helm of the institution. Originally, the chief executive of UMass Amherst was a president. When UMass Boston was founded in 1963, it was initially reckoned as an off-site department of the Amherst campus, and was headed by a chancellor who reported to the president. A 1970 reorganization transferred day-to-day responsibility for UMass Amherst to a chancellor as well, with both chancellors reporting on an equal basis to the president. The title "President of the University of Massachusetts" now refers to the chief executive of the entire five-campus University of Massachusetts system.

The current Chancellor of the Amherst campus is Dr. Kumble R. Subbaswamy. The Chancellor resides in Hillside, the campus residence for chancellors. On February 16, 2023, Dr. Javier Reyes was appointed the next Chancellor, to take office when Subbaswamy retires in June 2023. Reyes will be the first person of Hispanic descent to serve as Chancellor of the university.

There are approximately 1,300 full-time faculty at the university. The university is organized into nine schools and colleges and offers 111 bachelor's degrees, 75 master's degrees, and 47 doctoral degrees.

Students interested in studying outside of a particular major can apply to enroll in the bachelor's degree with Individual Concentration (BDIC) program. This is a unique program which allows students to design their own area of study. A BDIC concentration must be interdisciplinary, drawing from at least three fields or disciplines, and it may not duplicate an existing major. Courses can be selected from any department within the university as well as the campuses in the Five College Consortium. Course selection is guided by the students chosen faculty sponsor and a BDIC faculty supervisor. BDIC students are assigned to one of five academic clusters- Arts and Cultural studies; Business and Law; Communication; Education and Human Development; Natural Health, Computer Sciences and Engineering.

Additionally, the university offers two programs designed for adult and continuing education students, known as University Without Walls and Continuing and Professional Education.

Academics

Rankings and reputation

U.S. News & World Reports 2021 edition of America's Best Colleges ranked UMass Amherst tied for 66th on their list of "Best National Universities", and tied for 26th among 141 public universities in the U.S. The undergraduate computer science program tied for 31st among 481 U.S. colleges. UMass Amherst is accredited by the New England Commission of Higher Education.

The Isenberg School of Management's undergraduate business program was ranked by BusinessWeek in 2014 as the 36th best program in the country.

The linguistics program was ranked by QS World University Rankings in 2021 as the 2nd best globally.

The National Research Council ranked computer science at UMass Amherst 18th in quality of PhD education and ranked polymer science 2nd in quality of PhD education and 7th in quality of scholarship among all US materials departments. The Institute for Scientific Information ranked the chemical engineering program 5th, computer Science department 9th and recognized the geosciences department for producing the most cited paper on global warming.

Founded in 1971, the University Without Walls was one of the first adult bachelor's degree completion programs in the country.

The UMass Amherst campus is known for its sustainability. In 2010 the UMass Climate Action Plan (CAP) was approved, which documented the campus' plan to reach carbon neutrality by 2050. In 2011 UMass Amherst became one of the four colleges to receive a gold star from the Association for the Advancement of Sustainability in Higher Education. In 2013 UMass Amherst made it onto the Princeton review's Green Honor Roll and in 2014 received its second National Climate Leadership Award. Furthermore, this is one of the only public universities to use the fresh fruits and vegetables in the dining commons from its very own permaculture gardens.

Commonwealth Honors College

Commonwealth Honors College is the honors college at UMass. The honors college provides students the opportunity to intensify their UMass academic curriculum. The requirements of the college are to complete an honors college writing course, a seminar called "Ideas That Changed the World," two honors gen ed courses, an honors seminar called "Topics," and for advanced scholarship honors, several upper-level honors courses, including an honors thesis or project. Membership in the honors college is not required in order to graduate the University with higher Latin honors designations, such as magna or summa cum laude. Commonwealth Honors College provides honors students an additional community of students to interact with outside of their academic department and holds many social and academic events during the school year. In 2013, the University completed the Commonwealth Honors College Residential Community (CHCRC) on campus to serve the College, including classrooms, faculty housing, an administration area, and residence areas that houses 1,500 students.

Five College Consortium
UMass Amherst is part of the Five Colleges Consortium, which allows its students to attend classes, borrow books, work with professors, etc., at four other Pioneer Valley institutions: Amherst, Hampshire, Mount Holyoke, and Smith Colleges.

All five colleges are located within 10 miles of Amherst center, and are accessible by public bus. The five share an astronomy department and some other undergraduate and graduate departments.

UMass Amherst holds the license for WFCR, the National Public Radio affiliate for Western Massachusetts. In 2014, the station moved its main operations to the Fuller Building on Main Street in Springfield, but retained some offices in Hampshire House on the UMass campus.

Community service
UMass Amherst emphasizes community service as part of its academic programs. The Community Engagement Program (CEP) offers courses that combine classroom learning and community service, and sponsors programs such as the first year IMPACT learning community and the Community Scholars Program. Co-curricular service programs include the Alternative Spring Break, Engineers without Borders, the Legal Studies Civil Rights Clinical Project, the Medical Reserve Corps, Alpha Phi Omega, the Red Cross Club, the Rotaract Club, UCAN Volunteer, and the Veterans and Service Members Association (VSMA).

The White House has named UMass Amherst to the President's Higher Education Community Service Honor Roll for four consecutive years, in recognition of its commitment to volunteering, service learning, and civic engagement. They have also been named a "Community-Engaged University" by the Carnegie Foundation for the Advancement of Teaching. The Princeton Review included UMass Amherst in its Colleges with a Conscience: 81 Great Schools with Outstanding Community Involvement.

Research

UMass research activities totaled more than $200 million in fiscal year 2014. In 2016 the faculty adopted an open-access policy to make its scholarship publicly accessible online.

Researchers at the university made several high-profile achievements in recent years. In a bi-national collaboration, National Institute of Astrophysics, Optics and Electronics and the University of Massachusetts at Amherst came together and built Large Millimeter Telescope. It was inaugurated in Mexico in 2006 (on top of Sierra Negra).

A team of scientists at UMass led by Vincent Rotello has developed a molecular nose that can detect and identify various proteins. The research appeared in the May 2007 issue of Nature Nanotechnology, and the team is currently focusing on sensors, which will detect malformed proteins made by cancer cells.
Also, UMass Amherst scientists Richard Farris, Todd Emrick and Bryan Coughlin led a research team that developed a synthetic polymer that does not burn. This polymer is a building block of plastic, and the new flame-retardant plastic will not need to have flame-retarding chemicals added to their composition. These chemicals have recently been found in many different areas from homes and offices to fish, and there are environmental and health concerns regarding the additives. The newly developed polymers would not require addition of the potentially hazardous chemicals.

Environmental research
UMass Amherst researchers have positioned the campus as a national leader in sustainability.

Economics professor Robert Pollin has influenced the national discussion about how best to stimulate the US economy and promote sustainability. He and colleagues at the Political Economy Research Institute have developed a plan for national recovery that shows, for example, that investing in clean energy (wind power, solar, and biofuels) will create about three times as many good-paying jobs than conventional projects will, while reducing greenhouse gas emissions and dependence on foreign oil.

Since September 2009, the campus has won more than $36 million in competitive stimulus grants. These include:

 $7.1 million in grants from the National Science Foundation to approximately 20 separate researchers.
 $16 million from the Department of Energy to establish an Energy Frontier Research Center on campus to develop highly efficient non-silicon polymer materials for harvesting solar energy.
 $1.9 million to chemical engineer George Huber to further develop bio-fuels from inedible corn stalks, bark, wood waste, and similar biomass.

Other significant research in environmentally safe technology among UMass Amherst faculty includes:

 Microbiologist Susan Leschine has raised $25 million to commercialize technology that converts plant waste into ethanol using the Q microbe, discovered in the Quabbin Reservoir just east of the campus.
 James Manwell, director of the Renewable Energy Research Laboratory, leads testing on large wind-turbine blades at a new federal facility in Boston after helping construct two municipal wind turbines in Hull, Massachusetts.
 Microbiologist Derek Lovley discovered Geobacter, a tiny biological structure that can clean up groundwater and produce electricity through conductive microbial nanowires.
 The Northeast Climate Science Center, one of four national offices designated by the Department of the Interior is located at the University of Massachusetts.|
 The Molecular Playground project's goal is to expose the molecular aspect of nature to the public.

Admissions and enrollment

In 2012, the university reported that applications to the school had more than doubled since the Fall of 2003 and increased more than 80% since 2005. In 2015, a record high of 40,010 applications were received, with 58% of applicants being accepted, and 1.6% being accepted to the Commonwealth Honors College.

The incoming Class of 2022 had an average high school GPA of 3.90 out of a 4.0 weighted scale, up from an average GPA of 3.83 the year before. The average SAT score of the Class of 2022 was 1294/1600, and on average the students ranked in the top fifth of their high school class. Acceptance to the Commonwealth Honors College program of UMass Amherst is even more selective with an average SAT score of 1409/1600 and an average weighted high school GPA of 4.29.

First Year Student Statistics

This table does not account deferred, transfer applications or other unique situations.

Campus

The University's campus is situated on 1,450 acres (Nipmuc land), mainly in the town of Amherst, but also partly in the neighboring town of Hadley. These include North Apartments, Sylvan, Northeast, Central, Orchard Hill, Southwest, Commonwealth Honors College Residential Complex, as well as the two University owned apartment complexes, North Village and Lincoln Apartments. These are in turn surrounded by a ring of athletic facilities, smaller administration buildings, and parking lots.

The campus has its own Combined Heat and Power (CHP) generation facility. The plant, which was dedicated in 2009 after ten years of planning, replaced a coal burning power plant dating back to 1918 and has reduced the campus' greenhouse gas emissions by approximately 75%. In 2011, the CHP was recognized as the cleanest plant of its size in New England and has been recognized for maintaining 80% efficiency over six consecutive quarters. In 2008, the CHP received the Combined Cycle Journal Pacesetter Award for the best Combined Heat and Power plant project in the US that year. The award refers to its innovative design, efficiency, reliability, system redundancy, and environmental benefits. In 2009, the CHP received the Sustainable Campus Leadership Award from the International District Energy Association. The award states it was given "In recognition of exemplary public leadership in advancing energy efficiency and global environmental stewardship through investment in an innovative district energy system." The Environmental Protection Agency (EPA) presented the University of Massachusetts with the 2011 Combined Heat and Power Energy Star Award in an effort to recognize the reduced emissions and increased efficiency of the plant.

The W.E.B. Du Bois Library is one of two library buildings on campus and the tallest academic research library in the world, standing at 26 stories above ground and 286 feet (90.32 m) tall. Before its construction in the late 1960s, Goodell Hall was the University library, which was built after the library had outgrown its space in the 1885 "Old Chapel" building. Originally known as Goodell Library, the building was named for Henry H. Goodell, who had served as College Librarian, Professor of Modern Languages and English Literature, and eighth President of the Massachusetts Agricultural College. The Library is well regarded for its innovative architectural design, which incorporates the bookshelves into the structural support of the building. It is home of the memoirs and papers of the distinguished African-American activist and Massachusetts native W. E. B. Du Bois, as well as being the depository for other important collections, such as the papers of the late Congressman Silvio O. Conte. The library's special collections include works on movements for social change, African American history and culture, labor and industry, literature and the arts, agriculture, and the history of the surrounding region.

The Science and Engineering Library is the other library on campus, and is located in the Lederle Graduate Research Center Lowrise. UMass is also home to the DEFA Film Library, the only archive and study collection of East German films outside of Europe, and the Shirley Graham Du Bois Library in the New Africa House. The university has several buildings (constructed in the 1960s and 1970s) of importance in the modernist style, including the Murray D. Lincoln Campus Center and Hotel designed by Marcel Breuer, the Southwest Residential Area designed by Hugh Stubbins Jr. of Skidmore, Owings & Merrill, The Fine Arts Center by Kevin Roche, the W.E.B. Du Bois Library by Edward Durell Stone, and Warren McGuirk Alumni Stadium by Gordon Bunshaft. Many of the older dorms and lecture halls are built in a Georgian Revival style such as French Hall, Fernald Hall, Stockbridge Hall and Flint Laboratory.

The campus facilities underwent extensive renovations during the late 1990s. New and newly renovated facilities include student apartment complexes, the Hampshire Dining Commons, a library Learning Commons, a School of Management, an Integrated Science Building, a Nursing Building, a Studio Arts Building, the Combined Heat and Power (CHP) generation facility, a track facility, and a Recreation Center. Newly completed construction projects on campus include the new Campus Police Station, the George N. Parks Minuteman Marching Band Building, the Life Sciences Laboratories, and the Integrated Learning Center.

Residential life

Residential Life at the University of Massachusetts Amherst is one of the largest on-campus housing systems in the United States. Over 14,000 students live in 52 residence halls, while families, staff, and graduate students live in 345 units in two apartment complexes (North Village and Lincoln). The fifty-two residence halls and four undergraduate apartment buildings are grouped into seven separate and very different residential areas: Central, Northeast, Orchard Hill, Southwest, Sylvan, North Apartments, and the recently constructed Commonwealth Honors College Residential Community (CHCRC). Each possesses its own distinctive characteristics, inspired in part by location, in part by architecture, and in part by the different cultural or academic living/learning programs housed within. Each residential area houses classrooms, recreational and social centers, kitchenettes, and cultural centers - in addition to bedrooms, study areas, laundries, television rooms, and dining facilities. Each has its own student governing body and is, in effect, a community unto itself. 

Located in the central corridor of campus, the Honors Community houses undergraduate members of Commonwealth Honors College. In this community, undergraduates, staff, and faculty share an interwoven mix of double, single, suite, and apartment-style living options spread across six halls. This area featured a 24-hour full-service cafe during its first year, but it soon became clear that 24-hour operation was not profitable. The cafe is closed between 1 a.m. and 7 a.m. during the school year and closed during the summer. The community includes assembly and workshop rooms, as well as most Honors College programming and staff offices.

Major campus expansion

The University of Massachusetts Amherst campus embarked on a 10-year, $1 billion capital improvement program in 2004, setting the stage for re-visioning the campus's future. This includes construction of $156 million New Science Laboratory Building, $30 million Champions Basketball Center, an $85 million academic building, and $30 million in renovations to the football stadium.

In early 2016, the construction of a new electrical substation located near Tillson farm was completed. The purpose of the substation is to supply electricity to the university more efficiently and reliably, with estimated savings of $1 million per year. The project was created in partnership with the utilities company Eversource, and cost approximately $26 million. The new electrical substation works in conjunction with the university's pre-existing combined heat and power (CHP) plant.

In April 2017, the University of Massachusetts Amherst officially opened its new Design Building. Previously estimated at $50 million, the 87,000-square-foot facility is the most advanced CLT building in the U.S. and the largest modern wood building in the northeastern United States.

Mount Ida Campus of UMass Amherst
On April 6, 2018, Mount Ida College announced that the University of Massachusetts would be absorbing its campus. Mount Ida students were given a guaranteed transfer to UMass Dartmouth, and the campus became part of UMass Amherst. The campus was named Mount Ida Campus of UMass Amherst and functions as a satellite campus for UMass Amherst. The campus primarily serves as a hub for Greater Boston-area career preparation and experiential learning opportunities for UMass Amherst students. The programs that are offered at the newly acquired campus will align the strengths of UMass Amherst with the growing demand for talent in areas that drive the Massachusetts economy, including health care, business, computer science and other STEM specialties.

Campus safety
UMass Amherst implements a multitude of services to ensure safety on and off campus for all students. On-campus residence halls are constantly monitored and secured. There are cadets stationed at the entrances that monitor the area while students are signed into the building. Anyone who does not live in that specific building has to be signed in by a friend with legitimate identification to ensure the safety of everyone in that residence hall. In addition, there are about 350 security cameras constantly monitoring every residence hall and the doors are always locked. The only way to enter is with a student ID registered to that specific building. There is a system of “HELP” phones on campus. The "HELP" phone network is composed of approximately 110 emergency phones scattered about campus, and are available for people to use for emergency calls if they feel they are in danger or in an uncomfortable situation. These phones are easily recognizable by their bright blue light and have an emergency button that anyone can press which will automatically connect them to the UMass Police Department. This will alert the police to the users exact position so that they can send appropriate assistance.

UMass Amherst provides alerts via students' school e-mail, as well as text messages if they so choose. These alerts create awareness of any suspicious or criminal behavior occurring on or around campus. It creates an environment where students are always conscious of their surroundings and know exactly what is going on.

The UMass Amherst police department (abbreviated as UMPD) operates 24/7 and is accessible by dialing 911 (from a university owned landline) or (413) 545-3111 for emergencies, or (413) 577-8477 for non-emergencies and to leave confidential tips. Calling 911 from a cell phone will typically redirect users to the state-operated dispatch rather than UMPD. To ensure commuter safety the UMass Police Department employs a safety and escort service that offers a safe escort across campus every night. The UMPD has several specialized units that make up the department including bicycle, K-9, motorcycle, and mounted horseback units as well as foot and vehicle patrol.

The Police Cadet program has been a part of the UMPD since 2000. It is viewed as a successful program by the department and the UMass community since the cadets are an important part of the police department. Their presence can be seen mostly in the residential areas, where the cadets work very closely with police officers and Residence Hall Security. Cadets take part in a two-week "boot-camp"-style training in preparation for the position. The training consists of police techniques, performing foot patrols, parking enforcement, prisoner watch, and other functions to free officers. The cadets operate as the eyes and the ears of the police department as they can see and hear what the officers cannot, preventing problems and their escalation.

In the past, there had been several occurrences of large non-school sponsored gatherings labeled as riots, where UMass officials had been called in. After the Red Sox won the World Series in 2013, an estimated 3,000 students gathered in the outdoor space around South West Residence Hall. In response to the situation, UMass police officials were called in. Police accounts state that some students participated in disruptive behavior: knocking over trash bins and climbing trees. Rubber bullets and tear gas were dispersed into the crowds. According to WGGB, 14 people were arrested for failing to disperse and 1 for disorderly conduct. Whether or not the use of police force was necessary is still a controversial topic among students, the administration, and UMass and Amherst Police Department.

According to MassLive, other riots include one in 2007 after the Boston Red Sox lost in the 2008 playoffs, another when they lost in the World Series run in 2006, one after UMass' football team lost in the Division I-AA football championship in 2006, one after the Red Sox World Series victory in 2004, another after the Red Sox lost during the 2003 playoffs, one after the Patriots first Super Bowl victory over St. Louis in 2001 and another in 1986 after the Red Sox World Series loss. The majority of these riots have been non-violent on the side of the students, except for the 1986 riot in which an argument between hundreds of students intensified into racial altercations where a black student was attacked by 15-20 white students and beaten unconscious according to archives from The Republican. Videos and visual accounts of most of these events can be found online. In the wake of these events students have worked and are continuously working to start open dialogues with the administration and police department about campus safety, the right to gather, police force and better methods of crowd control.

The Boston Globe reported on the death of a student only called Logan, who died from a heroin overdose after working as a confidential informant for the UMass police department. After UMass police arrested Logan for selling LSD, he was offered the opportunity to work as a confidential informant in exchange for his freedom. UMass police did not suspect he was using drugs like heroin. Soon after the Globe's story was published, Chancellor Kumble Subbaswammy suspended the use of the program and required UMass Police to report to the Vice Chancellor of Student Affairs and Campus Life instead of the Vice Chancellor for Administration and Finance.

Iranian student admissions controversy
UMass Amherst issued an announcement in early 2015 stating: "the University has determined that it will no longer admit Iranian national students to specific programs in the College of Engineering (i.e., Chemical Engineering, Electrical & Computer Engineering, Mechanical & Industrial Engineering) and in the College of Natural Sciences (i.e., Physics, Chemistry, Microbiology, and Polymer Science & Engineering) effective February 1, 2015." The University claims that this announcement was posted because a graduate student entered Iran for a project and was later denied a visa. This event along with urging from legal advisers contributed to the belief that such incidents inhibited their ability to give Iranian students a "full program of education and research for Iranian students" and thus justified changing their admissions policies. The ensuing criticism on and off campus, as well as wide media publicity, changed the minds of school officials. As a result, UMass made a statement on February 18 committing to once again allowing Iranian students to apply to the aforementioned graduate programs. On the same day, an official in the U.S. Department of State stated in an interview that: "U.S. laws and regulations do not prevent Iranian people from traveling to the United States or studying in engineering program of any U.S. academic institutions." UMass Amherst replaced the ban with a policy aimed at designing specific curricula for admitted Iranian nationals based on their needs. While less controversial, this policy has still generated backlash, with one student saying "this university that's supposed to be so open-minded forcing him to sign a document saying he won’t go home and build a bomb or something is just really disappointing to see."

Student life

Arts on campus

The UMass Amherst campus offers a variety of artistic venues, both performance and visual art. The most prominent is Fine Arts Center (FAC) built in 1975. The FAC brings nationally known theater, music and dance performances to campus throughout the year into its performance spaces (Concert Hall, Bezanson Recital Hall, and Bowker Auditorium). These include several popular performance series: Jazz in July Summer Music Program, The Asian Arts & Culture Program, Center Series, and Magic Triangle Series presenting music, dance and theater performances, cultural arts events, films, talks, workshops, masterclasses and special family events. University Museum of Contemporary Art in the FAC has a permanent contemporary art collection of about 2,600 works and hosts numerous visual arts exhibitions each year as well as workshops, masterclasses and artist residencies.

The 9,000-seat Mullins Center, the multi-purpose arena of UMass Amherst hosts a wide variety of performances including speakers, rock concerts, and Broadway shows. In addition, the Music, Dance, and Theater Departments, the Renaissance Center, and multiple student groups dedicated to the arts provide an eclectic menu of performances throughout the year.

The Interdepartmental Program for Film Studies has been organizing the Massachusetts Multicultural Film Festival on campus since 1991.

Groups and activities

UMass Amherst has a history of protest and activism among the undergraduate and graduate population and is home to over 200 registered student organizations (RSOs).

SGA
The Student Government Association (SGA) is the undergraduate student governmental body, and provides funding for the many registered student organizations (RSOs) and agencies, including the Student Legal Services Office (SLSO) and the Center for Student Business (CSB). The SGA also makes formal recommendations on matters of campus policy and advocates for undergraduate students to the Administration, non-student organizations, and local and state government. As of the 2023 school year, the SGA had a budget of over $7.5 million per year, which is collected from students in the form of the $266 per year Student Activities Fee. It is used to fund RSOs, Agencies and the SGA itself.

UMass Permaculture
UMass Permaculture is one of the first university permaculture initiatives in the nation that transforms marginalized landscapes on the campus into diverse, educational, low-maintenance and edible gardens according to UMass officials. One of the most important aspects of UMass Permaculture is that it comes from the students and is ecologically and socially responsible. Rather than tilling the soil, a more sustainable landscaping method known as sheet mulching is employed. During November 2010, "about a quarter of a million pounds of organic matter was moved by hand", using all student and community volunteer labor and no fossil fuels on-site. The process took about two weeks to complete. Now, the Franklin Permaculture Garden includes a diverse mixture of "vegetables, fruit trees, berry bushes, culinary herbs and a lot of flowers that will attract beneficial insects."

ROTC
The Minuteman Battalion is the institution's Army ROTC battalion. Active on the Amherst campus, the program's Scabbard and Blade community service club is very active and represents UMass well throughout the year with food drives, assistance to local veteran's groups and assistance with the Medical Readiness Corps at UMass in preparing for large-scale medical disasters. Most students are on a full tuition scholarship. UMass-Amherst is the host program for the Pioneer Valley and Five Colleges Army ROTC programs including: Smith College, Mount Holyoke College, Amherst College, Hampshire College, Western New England University, Springfield College, Westfield State College and American International College (AIC).

Minuteman Marching Band

UMass Amherst has the largest marching band in New England. The Minuteman Marching Band consists of over 390 members and regularly plays at football games. The band was led by John Jenkins from 1963 to 1977. In 1977 George N. Parks took over until his death in September 2010. Timothy Todd Anderson became the director in 2011. The Minuteman Band also won the prestigious Sudler Trophy in 1998 for excellence. The band is well known across the nation for its style and excellence, particularly for its battery and pit ensemble. The band also performs in various other places and events like the Collegiate Marching Band Festival in Allentown, Pennsylvania, Bands of America in Indianapolis, Symphony Hall, Boston, The Macy's Thanksgiving Day Parade, Tournament of Roses Parade in Pasadena, California, and on occasion Montreal, Quebec, Canada.

Fraternities and sororities
UMass is home to numerous fraternities and sororities, organized under four councils: IFC, NPC, NPHC, and the MGC. Currently, several sororities & fraternities have officially recognized housing in the area including national fraternity Phi Sigma Kappa, whose first chapter was founded at UMass in 1873.

Several Greek Life organizations had houses on North Pleasant Street until Alpha Tau Gamma, Inc., which owned a total of nine properties at one point, did not renew the leases at the request of the University. The North Pleasant Street houses were colloquially known as 'Frat Row'. Most of Alpha Tau Gamma's Properties houses were out of code and were razed in November 2006. Alpha Tau Gamma sold the land to the University for $2,500,000 in 2007. ATG, which is the Fraternity of the Stockbridge School of Agriculture, then donated $500,001 to endow a new Director of Stockbridge.

National Pan-Hellenic Council organizations:

Alpha Phi Alpha
Alpha Kappa Alpha
Delta Sigma Theta
Iota Phi Theta 
Zeta Phi Beta

Multicultural Greek Council organizations:

Alpha Kappa Delta Phi
Beta Chi Theta
Delta Kappa Delta
Delta Xi Phi
Kappa Phi Gamma
Kappa Phi Lambda
Lambda Upsilon Lambda 
Pi Delta Psi
Sigma Psi Zeta

Panhellenic sororities:

Alpha Epsilon Phi
Alpha Chi Omega
Chi Omega
Iota Gamma Upsilon (local)
Kappa Kappa Gamma,
Sigma Delta Tau
Sigma Kappa
Sigma Sigma Sigma

IFC fraternities:

Alpha Chi Rho
Alpha Tau Gamma (local affiliated with Stockbridge School)
Delta Chi
Delta Sigma Phi
Kappa Sigma
Lambda Phi Epsilon
Phi Delta Theta 
Phi Sigma Kappa
Pi Kappa Phi 
Sigma Chi 
Sigma Phi Epsilon 
Tau Kappa Epsilon 
Theta Chi
Zeta Beta Tau

Honor societies, service, and veterans' organizations:

Alpha Phi Omega
Phi Sigma Pi
Kappa Kappa Psi and Tau Beta Sigma
Omega Delta Sigma
Order of Omega

Media

The Massachusetts Daily Collegian 
The Massachusetts Daily Collegian, the official newspaper of UMass Amherst, is published Monday through Thursday during the calendar semester. The Collegian is a non-profit student run organization which receives no funding from the University or from student fees. The Collegian operates entirely on advertising revenues. Founded in 1890, the paper began as Aggie Life, became the College Signal in 1901, the Weekly Collegian in 1914 and the Tri-Weekly Collegian in 1956. Published daily since 1967, the Collegian has been broadsheet since January 1994. The Daily Collegian is one of the largest daily college newspapers in New England and the country.

UVC-TV 19 

The Union Video Center is the University of Massachusetts' student-run television station, located in the basement of the Student Union. UVC-TV 19 is part of the University's Housing Cable Services Network and airs on channel 19 to over 11,000 viewers on campus via a closed circuit system. UVC began as the Student Video Project in 1974, and was renamed the Union Video Center in 1978 after growing into a full-fledged television station. Today, UVC-TV 19 serves as an educational training facility on campus for full-time undergraduate students.

WMUA 91.1 FM 

The student-operated radio station, WMUA, is a federally licensed, non-commercial broadcast facility serving the Connecticut River Valley of Western Massachusetts, Northern Connecticut, and Southern Vermont. Although the station is managed by full-time undergraduate students of the University of Massachusetts, station members can consist of various members of the University (undergraduate and graduate students, faculty and staff), as well as people of the surrounding communities. WMUA began as an AM station in 1949.

WSYL-FM
There was a student-run, extremely-low-power FM radio station which used the self-assigned identifier "WSYL-FM" (With Songs You Like) which operated in the basement of Cashin from the mid-1970s through the 1980s. It was very successful in terms of pleasing listeners and providing engineering and DJ experience for hundreds of students.

Athletics

UMass is a member of Division I of the National Collegiate Athletic Association (NCAA). The university is a member of the Atlantic 10 Conference, while playing ice hockey in the Hockey East Association. The football team joined the Mid-American Conference (MAC), in order to play at Football Bowl Subdivision (the sport's highest level) with games played at Gillette Stadium in 2012. In March 2014, the MAC and UMass announced an agreement for the Minutemen football team to leave the conference after the 2015 season due to UMass declining an offer to become a full member of the conference. In the agreement between the MAC and the university, there was a contractual clause that had UMass playing in the MAC as a football-only member for two more seasons if UMass declined a full membership offer. UMass announced that it would look for a "more suitable conference" for the team. UMass Amherst plays most of its home games at the 17,000-seat McGuirk Stadium on campus.

UMass originally was known as the Aggies, later the Statesmen, then the Redmen. In a response to changing attitudes regarding the use of Native American–themed mascots, they changed their mascot in 1972 to the Minuteman, based on the historical "minuteman" relationship with Massachusetts; women's teams and athletes are known as Minutewomen.

UMass football has enjoyed various levels of success over the years. As a founding member of the Yankee Conference, Massachusetts won 17 Yankee Conference Championships, appearing in one National Championship game during that timespan. They fell to Florida A&M in this inaugural Division I-AA Championship, 35–28. UMass' success continued as they began competition in the Atlantic 10 Conference in 1997. They went on to win four more conference titles while playing in the A-10 and make two more appearances in the National Championship game, winning it all in 1998. In 2006 the Minutemen took home the last A-10 title (the A-10 handed off management of their football league to the Colonial Athletic Association after the season) and made their most recent Championship game appearance. Their most recent conference championship came in 2007, the inaugural season under the CAA name.

Some journalists consider Boston College, the University of New Hampshire, the University of Connecticut, and the University of Rhode Island their biggest sports rivals. Temple University has also been a strong rival in the Atlantic 10, but the rivalry came to an end when Temple moved all of its sports programs to the Big East Conference in 2013.

The UMass Amherst Department of Athletics currently sponsors Men's Intercollegiate Baseball, Basketball, Cross Country, Ice Hockey, Football, Lacrosse, Soccer, Swimming, and Indoor and Outdoor Track & Field. They also sponsor Women's Intercollegiate Basketball, Softball, Cross Country, Rowing, Lacrosse, Soccer, Swimming, Field Hockey, Indoor and Outdoor Track & Field, and Tennis. Club sports offered which are not also offered at the varsity level are Men's Wrestling, Men's Rowing, Men's Tennis, Women's Ice Hockey, Men's and Women's Rugby, Men's and Women's Bicycle Racing, and Men's and Women's Fencing. Men's and Women's Downhill Skiing have been re-certified as club sports following the April 2, 2009 announcement of their discontinuation as varsity sports.

Notable alumni, faculty, and staff

Alumni

There are 243,628 University of Massachusetts Amherst alumni worldwide. Notable UMass Amherst alumni include Greg Landry, Jeff Corwin, Buffy Sainte-Marie, Taj Mahal, Bill Paxton, William Monahan, Kenneth Feinberg, Bill Cosby, Natalie Cole, Julius "Dr. J" Erving, Rick Pitino, Bill Pullman, Betty Shabazz, Briana Scurry, Jack Welch, John F. Smith Jr., Jean Worthley, Jeff Reardon, Brandon Tory, Mike Flanagan, Serena Williams, Lawrence Mestel and Richard Gere.

Faculty

Notable faculty have included Sheila Bair, the former Chairman of the US Federal Deposit Insurance Corporation; Chuck Close, celebrated photorealist; Samuel R. Delany, author and critic; Vincent Dethier, pioneer physiologist; Ted Hughes, British poet laureate; Max Roach, considered one of the most important jazz drummers in history; Lynn Margulis, famed biologist; Stephen Resnick and Richard D. Wolff, heterodox economists; James Tate, Pulitzer Prize–winning poet; and Robert Paul Wolff, in both philosophy and African-American studies. Current faculty of note include poet Peter Gizzi, T.S. Eliot Prize–winning poet Ocean Vuong, media critic Sut Jhally, and feminist economist Nancy Folbre.

See also
 University of Massachusetts Amherst Department of Food Science
 William P. Brooks (1851–1938), professor, eighth president of the Massachusetts Agricultural College, and second vice president of Sapporo Agricultural College, Japan
 Campus of the University of Massachusetts Amherst

Notes

References

Further reading

External links

 
 University of Massachusetts Athletics website

 
1863 establishments in Massachusetts
Business schools in Massachusetts
Educational institutions established in 1863
Flagship universities in the United States
Land-grant universities and colleges
University of Massachusetts Amherst
Schools of education in Massachusetts
Schools of public health in the United States
Universities and colleges in Hampshire County, Massachusetts
University of Massachusetts Amherst schools
Amherst
University subdivisions in Massachusetts